Alabashly may refer to:
 Alabaşlı, Azerbaijan
 Qasım İsmayılov, Azerbaijan